Frank Peter Bykowski (March 24, 1915 – April 1, 1985) was an American football guard who played one season with the Pittsburgh Steelers of the National Football League (NFL). He was drafted by the Pittsburgh Steelers in the sixth round of the 1940 NFL Draft. Bykowski played college football at Purdue University where he was a member of Sigma Pi fraternity.  He attended South Bend Central High School in South Bend, Indiana. He was also a member of the Milwaukee Chiefs of the third American Football League. He was also a coach after his playing career. Bykowski was named to the 1939 College Football All Polish-American Team. He was selected as a member of the 1940 College All Star Team.

During World War II, Bykowski served as a Chief Petty Officer, training United States Navy recruits as a physical training instructor. He was later commissioned as an officer and advanced to Lieutenant (junior grade), serving as an armed guard commander.

Bykowski was head football coach for Elwood Jr/Sr High School from 1947 to 1959 after being an assistant coach for two years. He then coached for Frankfort High School from 1959 to 1965 and Marion High School from 1966 to 1968. He finished his career with Tippecanoe School Corporation where he coached 1969 to 1975. As a teacher, he taught physical education, driver's education, and history. He was also a guidance counselor.

He was inducted into the Indiana Football Hall of Fame in 1976.

References

External links
Just Sports Stats

1915 births
1985 deaths
Players of American football from South Bend, Indiana
American football guards
Purdue Boilermakers football players
Pittsburgh Steelers players
Milwaukee Chiefs (AFL) players
American people of Polish descent
United States Navy personnel of World War II
United States Navy officers